Nikolay Vladimirovich Storozhenko was a Russian / Ukrainian nationalist, social and political activist, historian and an educator. He was a member of the Kiev Club of Russian Nationalists (1908-1918). After Revolution he emigrated to Yugoslavia and then to France. He is known as an author of many works on the Cossack history of Ukraine and Russia.

He is a graduate of Saint Vladimir Royal University of Kiev and a student of Volodymyr Antonovych. Storozhenko was a member of the Kiev Archaeographic Commission, the Nestor the Chronicler Historic Association and other history related organizations; a contributing editor of Kievskaya starina and number of other Russian history related magazines and periodicals.

He belonged to an old Cossack family of Storozhenko. He had a brother Andrey Storozhenko who also was a historian specialized in Slavic studies.

References

External links
 Pazyura, N.V. Mykola Storozhenko. Encyclopedia of history of Ukraine.
 Mykola Storozhenko. Hrebinka city website.

1862 births
1944 deaths
People from Poltava Oblast
People from Piryatinsky Uyezd
20th-century Ukrainian historians
Historians from the Russian Empire
19th-century Ukrainian historians